The Ashura massacre of March 2, 2004 in Iraq was a series of planned terrorist explosions that killed at least 80-100 and injured at least 200 Iraqi Shi'a Muslims commemorating the Day of Ashura.  The bombings brought one of the deadliest days in the Iraq occupation after the Iraq War to topple Saddam Hussein.

The attacks
Nine explosions were detonated in Karbala, accompanied by mortar, grenade, and rocket fire, killing over 100 people, while three explosions near the Kadhimiya Shrine in Baghdad killed 58 more.  Though the attack involved armed squads, car bombs, and up to a dozen suicide bombers, there was also an explosive-laden vehicle which was intercepted while trying to enter Basra, as were two suicide bombers in Karbala and others in Baghdad who had entered via Syria.  The squads armed with rockets and small arms were meant to kill those wounded by the blasts as well as to trap those trying to flee the carnage.

Jama'at al-Tawhid wal-Jihad, which considers Shia Islam to be heretical, was immediately held responsible for the attack, and it was believed their intent was to cause much more destruction than actually occurred.

Brigadier General Mark Kimmitt, the American commander in Baghdad, initially blamed Abu Musab al-Zarqawi for the attacks, but it was subsequently revealed that Zarqawi's field commander in Iraq, Abu Abdallah al-Hassan ibn Mahmoud, directed the attacks. Ayatollah Ali al-Sistani, a highly influential Shiite in Iraq, blamed the U.S. for allowing the attacks to occur, but Kimmitt had agreed with Shiite leaders to vacate the shrines out of respect for cultural differences.

US appointed Iraqi governing council condemned the attacks and announced a mourning period of three days. Due to this decision, the signing of an interim Iraqi constitution, which had been scheduled for Wednesday, was postponed as confirmed by Abdul Aziz al-Hakim, a council member.

References

External links

Thousands mourn for Shiite bombing victims

2004 murders in Iraq
21st-century mass murder in Iraq
Explosions in 2004
Mass murder in 2004
Suicide car and truck bombings in Iraq
Suicide bombings in Iraq
Terrorist incidents in Iraq in 2004
Karbala
2000s in Baghdad
2004
Violence against Shia Muslims in Iraq
Terrorist attacks attributed to al-Qaeda in Iraq
March 2004 events in Iraq